William de Botreaux (1337–1391) (pronounced "But'ry") (alt. “Bottreaux, Boterel Battrell etc.) was a prominent British West-Country baron during the reigns of King Edward III (1327-1377) and King Richard II (1377-1399).

Origins
He was the son and heir of William de Botreaux (d. 22 July 1349) of Forrabury, Cornwall (renamed after his family Boscastle, anciently “Bottreaux Castle”) Sheriff of Cornwall, by Isabel de Moels, younger daughter and co-heiress (with her sister Muriel, the wife of Thomas Courtenay (d. 1363) 5th son of Hugh de Courtenay, 1st Earl of Devon) of John de Moels, 4th Baron Moels(d.1337), of East Berkhampstead, Hertfordshire and feudal baron of a moiety of North Cadbury, Somerset, by his wife Joan Lovel, daughter of Richard Lovel of Castle Cary, Somerset. The family is believed to have come from Les Bottereaux, in Upper Normandy near Evreux, France. His father William (d. 1349) was the son of Reynold (d. 1346), son of  William (d. c. 1342), son of William (d. 1302), son of Reynold (d. 1273).

Career
He was born on 1 September 1337 at Botelet near Herodsfoot, three miles northeast of Lanreath, Cornwall. Botelet is 20 miles south of the family's ancient seat of Boscastle on the north Cornish coast. He received livery of his lands on 27 September 1359. In 1359, he took part in the expedition to Saxony and in 1380, he was in the expedition to support Portugal against Spain.

Created Baron by writ
During the reign of King Edward III he was first summoned to parliament by writ addressed to Willelmo de Botreaux on 24 February 1367/8. He thus became the 1st Baron Botreaux. He was likewise summoned on several further occasions the last of which was 12 September 1390.

Armorials
The armorials of de Botreaux are: Argent, a griffin segreant gules armed azure.

Marriage
In February 1369/70 he married Elizabeth Daubeny (d. 29/5/1433), daughter of Ralph Daubeny, 2nd Baron Daubeny (1305–c. 1342)
by Katherine Thweng, sister and co-heiress of Thomas Thweng, 4th Baron Thweng.

Progeny
He left the following progeny by Elizabeth Daubeny:
William de Botreaux, 2nd Baron Botreaux (1367–1395)
John de Botreaux (3rd son), lived at Molland-Bottreaux, Devon.

Death
He died on 10 August 1391. Before 1421 his widow Elizabeth became a nun at Tarrant Abbey, Dorset.

References

Sources
G. E. Cokayne Complete Peerage; vol 2, pp. 241–242

1337 births
1391 deaths
Peers created by Edward III
Barons Botreaux